Andrew Heard (21 August 1958 – 9 January 1993) was a British artist.

Biography
Heard was born in Hertford on 21 August 1958. He studied Art History at London University and at Chelsea School of Art, London. He lived in West Berlin for a period and some of his early successes were one-man shows were at the Friedman-Guinness Gallery in Germany: at Heidelberg in 1987 and Frankfurt in 1989. He also had solo exhibitions in the 1980s in Athens, Amsterdam, Paris and Zurich. From 1983 he shared a studio with the poet and artist David Robilliard. Heard died of AIDS in London in 1993.

New directions in his work are marked by large Strange Fruit canvases.

References

1958 births
1990 deaths
British artists
People from Hertford